{{DISPLAYTITLE:Rho2 Cephei}}

Rho2 Cephei, Latinized from ρ2 Cephei, or simply ρ Cephei, is a solitary star in the northern constellation of Cepheus. With an apparent visual magnitude of 5.50, it is faintly visible to the naked eye, forming an optical pair with Rho1 Cephei. Based upon an annual parallax shift of 13.31 mas as seen from the Earth, it is located about 245 light years from the Sun.

Rho2 Cephei is an A-type main sequence star with a stellar classification of A3 V, estimated to be 85 million years old. It has a high rate of rotation, showing a projected rotational velocity of 133 km/s.

References

Cephei, Rho2
Cepheus (constellation)
Cephei, Rho2
Durchmusterung objects
Cephei, 29
213798
111056
8591